Heinrich Jonen (1901–1960) was a German film producer. Jonen controlled his own company Meteor Film, but did much of his work for large studios. During the Nazi era he headed production at Tobis Film and Berlin Film. In the late 1950s he was placed in charge of production at the re-founded UFA company.

Selected filmography
 Don't Promise Me Anything (1937)
 I Love You (1938)
 Yvette (1938)
 Renate in the Quartet (1939)
 We Danced Around the World (1939)
 Bismarck (1940)
 The Star of Rio (1940)
 Her Other Self (1941)
 Melody of a Great City (1943)
 Wedding Night in Paradise (1950)
 When a Woman Loves (1950)
 A Heidelberg Romance (1951)
 Fritz and Friederike (1952)
 Captain Bay-Bay (1953)
 Jonny Saves Nebrador (1953)
 I Was an Ugly Girl (1955)
 Stresemann (1957)
 Stefanie (1958)
 Stefanie in Rio (1960)

References

Bibliography 
 Giesen, Rolf.  Nazi Propaganda Films: A History and Filmography. McFarland, 2003.

External links 
 

1901 births
1960 deaths
Film people from Cologne
German film producers